Sattiraju Lakshminarayana (15 December 1933 – 31 August 2014), known professionally as Bapu, was an Indian film director, painter, illustrator, cartoonist, screenwriter, music artist, and designer known for his works in Telugu cinema along with a few Hindi films. In 2013, he was awarded the Padma Shri, for his contribution to Indian art and cinema. He has garnered two National Honors, two National Film Awards, seven state Nandi Awards, two Filmfare Awards South, a Raghupathi Venkaiah Award, and a Filmfare Lifetime Achievement Award – South. 

Bapu's directorial venture Sakshi (1967) was showcased at Tashkent International film festival in 1968. Seeta Kalyanam (1976) was screened at the BFI London Film Festival, Chicago International Film Festival, San Reno and Denver International Film Festivals in 1978, and is part of the course at the British Film Institute. Tyagayya (1981) and Pelli Pustakam (1991) were premiered at the Indian Panorama of the International Film Festival of India. Bapu's 2011 film, Sri Rama Rajyam, had a special screening at International Film Festival of India on 28 November 2011.

In 1996, he appeared in the Doordarshan Documentary Eminent Cartoonists of India, and was awarded Lifetime Achievement from Indian Institute of Cartoonists in 2001. He gained international recognition through his art works viz., Bapu Bomma, The Navarasas, and the Indian Dances etc., which were held at the National Film Theatre, London, in 1978 and at the innumerable Telugu Conferences in the United States. He has worked as a graphic artist for J Walter Thomson, Efficient Publicities and F. D. Stewarts, Chennai.

In 1964, he was a delegate at the UNESCO sponsored seminar in Bangalore on Children's Books. The same year, he gave demonstrations for the training course programme on book illustrations and cover designs sponsored by UNESCO in Chennai. In the 1960s he has served as art Consultant for Ford Foundation sponsored The Southern Language Book Trust. He has designed and illustrated several books for leading publishers in South India out of which, five received Government Awards. He has also done the same for innumerable works drawn from Puranas and folklore.

Early life and background
Bapu was born on 15 December 1933, in Narsapur, in present-day West Godavari district, Andhra Pradesh, India to Sattiraju Venugopala Rao and Suryakantam. He has worked as a political cartoonist for the newspaper Andhra Patrika in 1945. He holds B.Com (1953) and BL (1955) from University of Madras.

Painting

Bapu's paintings focus on Hindu mythological characters, and he has painted the Hindu epic Ramayana as a pictorial story.  His character portrayals, such as Shiva, Bhima, Duryodhana, look distinctly male with wide chests, large jaws and large biceps; while Krishna and Rama are more feminine in build.

His paintings have decorated the cover pages of many magazines in India and Abroad. Telugu Naadi Magazine published from USA for Telugu audience have published Bapu's great paintings. Bapu also later served on their advisory board to guide and have an outstanding content for the magazine that catered to Telugu people.

Association with Ramana

Bapu's family was staying in Madras and in 1942, when the Japanese bombed Madras, there was a panic exodus and Bapu's family moved to Narasapuram and stayed there till 1945, when the Second World War ended. Bapu studied in Taylor High School, Narasapuram during these years.

Mullapudi Venkataramana's father, who was working as a Sub-Registrar was posted at Narasapuram during the years 1942-45 and so, Venkataramana also studied in Taylor high School, Narasapram, during those years. They were classmates during those three years and that is how their association started. They continued schooling at Kesari High School, Madras. Ramana's first short story 'Amma Maata Vinakapote' was published in 1945 in 'Bala', a children's magazine published by Radio Annayya (Nyayapathi Raghava Rao), he was 14 then. Bapu illustrated the story. That was the beginning of their career as a writer-producer -illustrator- filmmaker duo".

Started as an illustrator-story writer team and then turning into a film-director-writer duo, they have contributed immensely to the enrichment of Telugu cultural ethos through literature and cinema. When one mentions Bapu, then one is bound to mention Ramana's name too and vice versa. The most notable achievement in his movie making is his success in capturing the nativity of Telugu people and translating it great on-screen visuals.

Ventures like Sampoorna Ramayanam, Ramanjaneya Yuddham and Seeta Kalyanam have been the milestones of Telugu cinema, while historical films like Thyagayya, Bhakta Kannappa and  Shreenatha kavisarvabhouma have been hugely successful. Bapu-Ramana combination has created movie magic on the large screen with some of the path breaking films in Telugu cinema and are ever remembered for films like Radha kalyanam, Velugu needalu, Bharyabhartalu, Bhogimanta, Mutyala Muggu, 'Sakshi, Mr. Pellam', Pelli Pustakam. The duo directed Mana Voori Pandavulu (1978) which won the Filmfare Award for Best Film - Telugu.

Hindi cinema
Bapu is known for his classic movies in Indian cinema, Bapu has directed Hindi films such as Hum Paanch, Bezubaan, Woh Saat Din, Mohabbat, Pyari Behna, Mera Dharam, Diljalaa, Prem Pratigyaa and Paramaatma.

Death
Bapu had suffered heart attacks many times throughout his career. He was admitted into a hospital at Chennai in mid August 2014. He suffered from a cardiac arrest on 31 August 2014, and died later on the same day.

He was given a state funeral by the Government of Tamil Nadu.

Awards and honours 

Civilian honours
Padma Shri – Government of India – 2013

National honours
Life Time Achievement Award from Indian Institute of Cartoonists – 2001
President of India Rashtrapati Award from the Academy of Fine Arts, Tirupati

National Film Awards
National Film Award for Best Feature Film in Telugu – Mutyala Muggu
National Film Award for Best Feature Film in Telugu – Mister Pellam

Filmfare Awards South
 Filmfare Best Director Award (Telugu) – Seeta Kalyanam (1976)
 Filmfare Best Director Award (Telugu) – Vamsa Vruksham (1980)
 Filmfare Lifetime Achievement Award – South – (2012)

Nandi Awards
Raghupathi Venkaiah Award – Life Time Achievement in Telugu cinema – 1986

Nandi Award for Best Feature Film (director)
1971: Balaraju Katha
1973: Andala Ramudu
1975: Mutyala Muggu
1991: Pelli Pustakam
1993: Mr. Pellam
2011: Sri Rama Rajyam

Other Honours
Asthana Vidwan by Andhra Pradesh Academy of Arts.
South Indian Film Director's Association Award for Best direction – Sampoorna Ramayanam – 1972
Visishta Puraskaramu from Potti Sreeramulu Telugu University – 2002
Life Time Achievement Award from Telugu Association of North America
"Shiromani" award fromBooks:  American Telugu Association – 1992
Honorary Doctorate "Kala Prapoorna" from Andhra University – 1991
Raja-Lakshmi Award in 1982 from Sri Raja-Lakshmi Foundation, Chennai – 1982

Filmography

Sakshi (1967) 
Bangaaru Pichika (1968) 
Buddhimantudu (1969) 
Inti Gowravam (1970) 
Balaraju Katha (1970) 
Sampoorna Ramayanamu (1971) 
Andala Ramudu (1973) 
Sri Ramanjaneya Yuddham (1974) 
Mutyala Muggu (1975) 
Sita Kalyanam (1976) 
Sri Rajeswari Vilas Coffee Club (1976) 
Bhakta Kannappa (1976) 
Sneham (1977) 
Mana Voori Pandavulu (1978) 
Gorantha Deepam (1978) 
Toorpu Velle Railu (1979) 
Vamsa Vruksham (1980) 
Rajadhi Raju (1980) 
Pandanti Jeevitam (1980) 
Kaliyuga Ravanaasurudu (1980) 
Hum Paanch* (1980) 
Tyagayya (1981) 
Radha Kalyanam (1981) 
Bezubaan* (1982) 
Krishnaavataram (1982) 
Pelleedu Pillalu (1982) 
Neethi Devan Mayakkam (1982) 
Edi Dharmam Edi Nyayam? (1982) 
Mantri Gari Viyyankudu (1983) 
Woh Saat Din* (1983) 
Seethamma Pelli (1984) 
Mohabbat* (1985) 
Pyari Behna* (1985) 
Bullet (1985) 
Kalyana Tamboolam (1986) 
Mera Dharam* (1986) 
Diljalaa* (1987) 
Prem Pratigyaa* (1989) 
Pelli Pustakam (1991) 
Mr. Pellam (1993) 
Srinatha Kavi Sarvabhowmudu (1993) Pelli Koduku (1994) Paramaatma* (1994) Rambantu (1996) Radha Gopalam (2005)Sundarakanda (2008) Sri Rama Rajyam'' (2011) 

Those marked as * are Hindi films

Bibliography 
 Ramayanam, co-written with Ramana. This book was published in Telugu, English and French languages.
 Maha Bharatam, co-written with Ramana
 Bapu Ramaneeyam, co-written with Ramana
 Koti Kommachi, along co-written Ramana
 (Im)Koti Kommachi, co-written with Ramana
 Kosaru Kommachi, Bapu Ramaneeyam along with Ramana
 Bapu Cartoonulu -1
 Bapu Cartoonulu -2
 Bommalu Geeyandi
 Budugu, co-written with Ramana

See also
 Raghupathi Venkaiah Award

References

External links
bapuartcollection.com Bapu's Official Website with an extensive art collection

"Bapu: A Multifaceted Artist"- an article on Bapu 

2014 deaths
University of Madras alumni
Telugu film directors
Nandi Award winners
1933 births
Recipients of the Padma Shri in arts
Recipients of the Rashtrapati Award
Indian cartoonists
Filmfare Awards South winners
Hindi-language film directors
Indian male screenwriters
People from West Godavari district
Writers from Andhra Pradesh
Film directors from Andhra Pradesh
20th-century Indian composers
Indian male songwriters
20th-century Indian film directors
21st-century Indian film directors
20th-century Indian dramatists and playwrights
21st-century Indian dramatists and playwrights
Hindi screenwriters
Telugu screenwriters
Indian male painters
Painters from Andhra Pradesh
20th-century Indian painters
21st-century Indian painters
Screenwriters from Andhra Pradesh
20th-century Indian male writers
21st-century Indian male writers
20th-century male musicians
20th-century Indian male artists
21st-century Indian male artists